Baiba is a feminine Latvian given name. The associated name day is December 4. Notable people with the name include:

Baiba Bendika (born 1991), Latvian biathlete
Baiba Bičole (born 1931), Latvian-American poet
Baiba Broka (born 1973), Latvian actress
Baiba Broka (born 1975), Latvian lawyer and politician
Baiba Indriksone (born 1932), Latvian actress
Baiba Skride (born 1981), Latvian classical violinist

References

Feminine given names
Latvian feminine given names